The 1975 Cricket World Cup Final was a One Day International cricket match played at Lord's, London on 21 June 1975 to determine the winner of the 1975 Cricket World Cup. It was the second time that the West Indies and Australia had met in the tournament after playing against each other in the group stage. The West Indies won the match by 17 runs to claim their first title.

Road to the final

West Indies
West Indies qualified for the knockouts with a first-place finish in Group B. The team won all three of their matches against Australia, Pakistan and Sri Lanka. Then in the semi final against New Zealand, the opposition opened brilliantly, but when Glenn Turner fell, the wickets tumbled the West Indies scored the required 158 to reach the final.

Australia
Australia made it through to the knockouts in second place with their only loss being against the West Indies. But they did defeat Pakistan and Sri Lanka to take on England in the semi final. Gary Gilmour took six wickets in the English innings to help them through to the final.

Final

Summary
The first Cricket World Cup final was played on 21 June (Midsummer of that year), a sunny day, in front of a capacity crowd of 26,765. Australia won the toss and invited the West Indies to bat, hoping to make use of ideal bowling conditions. The first moment of drama came when opener Roy Fredericks was dismissed hit wicket; he hooked a bouncer from Dennis Lillee for six, but in his follow-through lost his balance and knocked the bails off the stumps. Australia were on top at 50/3 when West Indian captain Clive Lloyd came to the crease in partnership with veteran Rohan Kanhai. The pair swung the match in the West Indies' favour by putting on 149 for the fourth wicket. Kanhai played the anchor role – not scoring for 11 overs – while Lloyd took on the Australian bowling attack, surviving a dropped catch on 26 to score a memorable century off 82 balls with 12 fours and 2 sixes and was dismissed shortly afterwards for 102. Kanhai, in what would be his farewell from international cricket, scored an invaluable 55, and solid contributions from Keith Boyce and Bernard Julien helped the West Indies close their innings at 291/8. Burly left-arm seamer Gary Gilmour was the pick of the Australian bowlers with 5/48, backing up his amazing semi-final performance.

The Australian run chase began steadily enough; at the 20-over mark, the Aussies were at 80/1 with Alan Turner and captain Ian Chappell taking advantage of an easy pitch and fast outfield. Then Viv Richards, who had failed with the bat, left his mark on the match with the next three run-outs. First he swooped in and dismissed Turner with a direct hit from close range, then Greg Chappell was also out with a direct hit after a slight misfield. Doug Walters came in and helped his captain steady the ship. Australia were at 162/3 with 21 overs remaining when Chappell, facing his opposing captain, pushed a ball to the left of mid-wicket and started off for a run. He hesitated initially when he saw Richards approaching, but started off again after Richards fumbled the ball, only to be caught short of the crease by Richards' lightning recovery and return to Lloyd at the bowler's end. In each situation, the batsmen probably would have made the run had they not hesitated. When Lillee joined Jeff Thomson as last man in, Australia required 59 runs to win off seven overs. The duo kept the game alive, putting on an unlikely last-wicket stand. With three overs remaining, the game reached an unlikely climax when Lillee hit a no-ball to Fredericks at extra cover off Vanburn Holder, and the crowd rushed onto the field oblivious to the umpire's call. Amid the chaos, Fredericks attempted a run-out but missed and the ball disappeared into the crowd. Lillee and Thomson kept running between the wickets until the crowd were dispersed. When play was resumed, the umpires decided to give Australia two runs. After protest from Thomson, they awarded three runs.

Match details

See also

 ICC Cricket World Cup

References

External links
 Cricket World Cup 1975 from Cricinfo

International sports competitions in London
Cricket World Cup Final, 1975
Final, 1975 Cricket World Cup
Cricket World Cup Final, 1975
Cricket World Cup Finals
1975–76 Australian cricket season
Lord's
Cricket in London